GameRoom Magazine is an American magazine focusing on game room products (pinball, arcade games, jukeboxes, etc.). It was founded in 1988 by Dave C. and Donna Cooper of New Albany, Indiana, and was created to serve the growing market of coin-op memorabilia collectors, hobbyists, and restorers. The first issue, dated January 1989, focused on jukeboxes. The magazine also covered other coin-operated playthings, such as pinball machines, slot machines, and gumball machines, in addition to related items such as carousels, gas station memorabilia, and antique ice cream scoops.

History
In 1993 GameRoom absorbed a competing periodical, The Pinball Trader. To serve this market, GameRoom increased its pinball machine coverage.

GameRoom was subsequently sold to Tim and Jacqueline Ferrante after the passing of Dave Cooper in September 1996. After relocating the magazine's homebase to Keyport, New Jersey, the magazine grew to feature regular columnists, more pages, a website online, and a merchandise department.

Coverage of arcade video games increased in January 1997, and in 2001 GameRoom published The Arcade Video Game Price Guide, the world's first comprehensive pricing guide for arcade video games.

In late 2005, after nine years, the Ferrantes sold the magazine to Kevin Steele, best known as the creator of RetroBlast!, a website focusing on the home arcade industry. The first issue under Steele's direction was the January 2006 issue. Under his ownership, GameRoom features increased content, usually around 64 pages an issue, and full color pages throughout the magazine.

Around November 17, 2010 a notice was posted to the magazine's website announcing the magazine was no longer economically feasible to produce and would cease publication immediately.  The last issue produced was October 2010 - volume 22 number 10.

On May 1, 2014, The Pinball Company announced it had acquired the assets of GameRoom and had plans to re-launch the magazine in the fall of that year.  The magazine is now a quarterly publication and provides more high quality images of new and classic pinball machines and arcades.  It continues to feature articles related to game room products and those who play and collect them.  Five issues have been published (as of September 2016) under publisher, Nic Parks, and Editor Meredith Hoenes-Buckman, both of Columbia, MO.

Focus
Coverage of pinball games, jukeboxes, arcade video games, and arcade emulation cabinets are frequent topics, as are tips on repairing and restoring these machines. Interviews with game creators and programmers, spotlights on individual collector's home game room layouts, reviews of topical books and DVDs, and news items of interest to those with game rooms are also featured monthly.

References

External links
GameRoom website

Monthly magazines published in the United States
Video game magazines published in the United States
Defunct computer magazines published in the United States
Magazines established in 1989
Magazines disestablished in 2000
Magazines published in Indiana
Magazines published in New Jersey